George Vaughn may refer to:

 "George Vaughn", a songwriting alias of George Vaughn Horton (1911-1988), American songwriter
 George S.E. Vaughn (1823–1899), Confederate spy in the American Civil War
 George Augustus Vaughn, Jr. (1897–1989), American fighter ace in World War I
 George L. Vaughn (–1949), American jurist
 George W. Vaughn (1809–1877), mayor of Portland, Oregon, 1855–1856

See also
 George Vaughan (disambiguation)